The Madonna of the Cords (Italian - Madonna dei Cordai) is a c. 1433-1435 relief sculpture attributed to Donatello. It was acquired by Stefano Bardini and is in the Museo Bardini, in Florence, since 1922. 

The work is multi-material: on a wooden base engraved with fillings is the Madonna and the Child, in polychrome stucco, with a mosaic background with silver-plated leather tesserae, meccated and covered with glass, and presents applications of ropes.

References

Sculptures of the Madonna and Child
Sculptures by Donatello
Sculptures in the collection of the Museo Bardini